Pleasant Ridge is an unincorporated community in northern Barry County, Missouri, United States. It is located on Missouri Supplemental Routes Z and VV, seven miles east of Monett.

History
Pleasant Ridge at one time was home to a small gas station and convenience store, school, church and several residences. The schoolhouse still stands on the southwest corner of the intersection of Routes Z and VV. The cannery is no longer standing, however it is believed to have been located at Tom Town close to Little Flat Creek approximately 4.5 miles south of Pleasant Ridge. There was also a mill on Little Flat Creek across from the cannery owned by John Sperandio.

The Tom Town Historic District was added to the National Register of Historic Places in 1989.

Climate
The climate is characterized by relatively high temperatures and evenly distributed precipitation throughout the year.  The Köppen Climate Classification subtype for this climate is "Cfa" (Humid Subtropical Climate).

References

Unincorporated communities in Barry County, Missouri
Unincorporated communities in Missouri